The North, Central American and Caribbean section of the 2026 FIFA World Cup qualification will act as the qualifiers for the 2026 FIFA World Cup, to be held in Canada, Mexico and the United States, for national teams which are members of the Confederation of North, Central American and Caribbean Association Football (CONCACAF). Three direct slots and two inter-confederation play-off slots in the final tournament were available for CONCACAF teams.

Format
On 9 May 2017, the FIFA Council approved the slot allocation for the 2026 FIFA World Cup, which included six direct spots and two inter-confederation play-off spots for the CONCACAF region. However, in a change of format from previous World Cups, there would be no dedicated host country slot, with the slots of automatically qualifying host countries now taken from the quota of its confederation. If the tournament were to be co-hosted, the FIFA Council would decide which host countries would qualify automatically. On 13 June 2018, three members of CONCACAF—Canada, Mexico and the United States—were selected as hosts for the 2026 World Cup by the 68th FIFA Congress.

On 14 February 2023, the FIFA Council awarded automatic berths for all three host countries, leaving three direct slots and two inter-confederation play-off slots to be decided through CONCACAF qualification. On 28 February, CONCACAF announced the qualifying format for 2026 World Cup qualification.

First round: Four CONCACAF teams, ranked 29 to 32 based on the FIFA rankings of November 2023, will be divided into two matchups, played on a two-legged home-and-away basis. The two winners will advance to the second round.
Second round: Thirty teams, the two winners from the first round and CONCACAF teams ranked 1 to 28 based on the FIFA rankings of November 2023, will be drawn into six groups of five teams. They will play single round-robin matches (two home and two away), with group winners and runners-up qualifying for the third round.
Third round: The twelve teams advancing from the second round will be drawn into three groups of four teams. They will play double round-robin home-and-away matches, with the three group winners qualifying for the World Cup. The two best-ranked runners-up will advance to the inter-confederation play-offs.

Entrants
As Canada, Mexico and the United States were awarded automatic berths as co-hosts, they will not enter qualifying. The remaining 32 FIFA-affiliated national teams from CONCACAF entered qualification. Based on the FIFA rankings of November 2023, the top 28 teams will receive a bye to the second round, while the lowest four teams will enter the first round.

Schedule
The CONCACAF schedule for qualification is as follows.

First round

The bottom four CONCACAF teams, ranked 29 to 32 based on the FIFA rankings of November 2023, will be divided into two matchups, played on a two-legged home-and-away basis. The pairings are predetermined, with the 29th ranked team facing the 32nd ranked team, and the 30th ranked team facing the 31st ranked team. The two winners will advance to the second round.

Second round

The top twenty-eight CONCACAF teams in the FIFA rankings of November 2023 will enter in the second round, to be joined by the two winners of the first round. Teams will be drawn into six groups of five teams, and will play single round-robin matches (two home and two away). The six group winners and six group runners-up will advance to the third round.

Group A

Group B

Group C

Group D

Group E

Group F

Third round

In the third round, the twelve teams advancing from the second round will be drawn into three groups of four teams. They will play double round-robin home-and-away matches, with the three group winners qualifying for the World Cup. The two best-ranked runners-up will advance to the inter-confederation play-offs.

Group A

Group B

Group C

Ranking of second-placed teams

Inter-confederation play-offs

The best two runners-up from the third round will advance to the inter-confederation play-offs, with exact dates yet to be determined.

Qualified teams
The following teams from CONCACAF qualified for the final tournament.

Notes

References

External links

Concacaf
2026
2023–24 in CONCACAF football
2024–25 in CONCACAF football
2025–26 in CONCACAF football